The Toyota WW engine family is a series of 16 valve DOHC inline-4 turbo diesel engines with common rail injection. These engines are based on the BMW N47, modified for use in Toyota vehicles, starting with the Verso in 2014. This involved the development of a number of new components, including engine mounts, a dual-mass flywheel, a new gearbox housing and gearing and a stop/start system to further improve efficiency and reduce emissions. The WW engine is offered in 1.6 (112 PS, 270 Nm) and 2.0 liter (143 PS, 320 Nm) versions.

1WW

Also mounted in the F20 BMW 116d EfficientDynamics, F20 114d (95 PS) and the Mini Cooper D and Countryman D series.

Applications:
Toyota Verso 1.6 D-4D
Toyota Auris
Toyota Avensis

2WW

Turbocharged

Applications:
Toyota Avensis 2.0 D-4D
Toyota RAV4 2.0 D-4D

References

WW engine
Diesel engines by model
Straight-four engines